Kivledalen is a valley in Seljord municipality and lies between the Skorve and Hattefjell mountains.

History
The first known settlement in the valley was established in the 16th century.

Kivledal is mentioned in several Norse sagas and Norwegian rural legends, the best known being the legend of Kivlemøyane. According to the legend, a church stood at Nystaulækrun in the medieval period.

Recreation
Kivledal is known  as a good recreation place for the Seljord region. Hiking to Gøysen (1370 m) via Listaul and to Nordnibba (1360 m) via Skrovestaul is popular. In the winter a fit skier can travel to Lomma and Manndal.

References

Valleys of Vestfold og Telemark